Vladimir Fyodorovich Vavilov (5 May 1925 – 11 March 1973) was a Russian guitarist, lutenist and composer. He was a student of Pyotr Isakov (guitar) and Iogann Admoni (composition) at the Rimski-Korsakov Music College in Leningrad.

Biography
Vavilov was active as a performer on both lute and guitar, as a music editor for a state music publishing house, and more importantly, as a composer. He routinely ascribed his own works to other composers, usually of the Renaissance or Baroque (occasionally from later eras), usually with total disregard of the appropriate style, in the spirit of other mystificators of the previous eras. His works achieved enormous circulation, and some of them achieved true folk-music status, with several poems set to his melodies.

Vavilov died aged 47, of pancreatic cancer, a few months before the appearance of "The City of Gold", which became a hit overnight.

The most famous of his anonymous or misattributed compositions are: 
"Canzona by Francesco da Milano". Poets Anri Volokhonsky and Alexei Khvostenko would later set lyrics to this music, the song called "The City of Gold" song (in Russian "Город Золотой"). The song, in turn, would become a hit in the 1980s when it was performed by Aquarium for the soundtrack for the film Assa.
"Mazurka by Andrey Sychra",
"Elegy by Mikhail Vyssotsky",
"Russian Melody (tremolo study) by Mikhail Vyssotsky",
"Ricercar by Niccolo Nigrino",
"Impromptu" by Miliy Balakirev.
 "Ave Maria". Vavilov wrote this aria with the ascription "Anonymous", and it was later mis-attributed to Giulio Caccini. It is often performed, notably by Inessa Galante, Andrea Bocelli, Sumi Jo and Charlotte Church, inter alia.

References

External links
Complete bio in Russian 
"Vladimir F. Vavilov" in Illustrated Biographical Encyclopedic Dictionary 

"Ave Maria" Giulio Caccini. By Vavilov. (Musical hoaxes) 

1925 births
1973 deaths
20th-century classical composers
20th-century guitarists
Composers for lute
Deaths from cancer in the Soviet Union
Deaths from pancreatic cancer
Historicist composers
Russian male guitarists
Musical hoaxes
Russian classical composers
Russian classical guitarists
Russian lutenists
Russian male classical composers
Soviet male classical composers
20th-century Russian male musicians